Matthew Martin Little is an American politician and a former member of the Minnesota Senate. A member of the Minnesota Democratic–Farmer–Labor Party (DFL), he represented District 58 in the southern Twin Cities metropolitan area.

Early life, education, and career
Little graduated from Rosemount High School in 2003. He graduated with a bachelor's degree in political science from University of Minnesota Morris in 2007.

He worked as a regional field coordinator for the National Association of Letter Carriers in Washington, D.C. for two years and spent one year teaching English in Chile before attending the University of Minnesota Law School. In 2014, he earned his juris doctor, graduating magna cum laude.

In 2010, Little was elected to the Lakeville City Council. In 2012, at the age of 27, Little became the youngest person in Lakeville's history to be elected mayor.

Little works as an attorney at his firm, Little Law, in Lakeville.

Minnesota Senate
Little was narrowly elected to the Minnesota Senate in 2016, where he served on the jobs and economic growth, transportation, and veterans and military affairs committees. Little has gained national attention for his use of the social media app TikTok, where he has amassed more than 100,000 followers.

In 2020, Little was defeated by Republican Zach Duckworth in his bid for re-election.

Elections

2016

2020

References

External links

 Official Senate website
 Official campaign website
 Matt Little TikTok account

Living people
People from Lakeville, Minnesota
University of Minnesota Morris alumni
University of Minnesota Law School alumni
Minnesota lawyers
Minnesota city council members
Mayors of places in Minnesota
Democratic Party Minnesota state senators
21st-century American politicians
1984 births